Yedikule station is an indefinitely closed railway station on the Istanbul suburban. It is located in the Yedikule neighborhood in southwest Fatih. The Yedikule Electric Train Depot is located right next to the station but was closed down in the early 2000s. The station had one track servicing an island platform (eastbound track) during the construction of the Marmaray tunnels, the westbound track being temporarily removed. Yedikule was served by the İstanbul-Halkalı Line, which was abandoned with the opening of Marmaray.

References

Fatih
Railway stations in Istanbul Province
Railway stations opened in 1872
Railway stations closed in 2013
1872 establishments in the Ottoman Empire
Defunct railway stations in Turkey